Abzaevo (Abzay) is a rural locality (a selo) and the administrative centre of Abzaevsky Selsoviet, Kiginsky District, Bashkortostan, Russia. The population was 558 as of 2010. There are 6 streets.

Geography 
Abzaevo is located 34 km north of Verkhniye Kigi (the district's administrative centre) by road. Masyakovo is the nearest rural locality.

Ethnicity 
The village is inhabited by Bashkirs and others.

References 

Rural localities in Kiginsky District